John Horne Blackmore (March 27, 1890 – May 2, 1971) was a Canadian school teacher and principal and Canadian politician. He was one of the first elected members and leaders of the Social Credit Party of Canada, a political party in Canada that promoted the social credit theories of monetary reform.

Life and career
Born in Sublett, Idaho, he immigrated to the Cardston area as a child. He was brought up in a Mormon household.

He attended the University of Alberta and Calgary Normal School.

Blackmore was elected to the House of Commons of Canada in the 1935 election as Member of Parliament representing Lethbridge, Alberta. The Social Credit movement had swept to power in Alberta in the 1935 Alberta provincial election just weeks earlier. He was chosen the party's parliamentary leader. 

He formed the material he was saying in speeches into book form, and Money the Master Key was published in 1939. The book describes "Money Power,"  "the Designing Will that pulls hidden strings."ref>Alberta Legislature Library</ref>

In 1939, Social Credit merged into William Herridge's New Democracy movement, with Herridge acknowledged as the new party's leader. However, Herridge himself failed to win a seat in the 1940 federal election.In the subsequent parliament Blackmore acted as leader of the elected New Democracy MPs, all Social Crediters.

Blackmore served as party leader until 1944 when Social Credit held its first national convention and acclaimed as leader Alberta MP Solon Earl Low. Blackmore retained his Lethbridge seat until he was defeated in the 1958 election in which Social Credit lost all of its MPs. (Progressive-Conservatives took all Alberta seats although they got less than 60 percent of the votes cast in Alberta.)

Blackmore was the first Mormon to be elected to the Canadian House of Commons.

He was excommunicated in 1947 for "teaching and advocating the doctrine of plural marriage" at secret meetings in Southern Alberta. At such meetings, men debated whether Mormon leaders were wrong to have renounced Joseph Smith's revelation regarding polygamy. Though not a polygamist himself, Blackmore urged Parliament to repeal the anti-polygamy law and succeeded in removing specific references to Mormons in the law. His nephew, Winston Blackmore, is the leader of Canada's largest polygamist group and was charged by the RCMP with polygamy in 2009. He challenged the law's constitutionality.

Blackmore was criticized for his views on Jews, and the Encyclopaedia Judaica said he "frequently gave public aid and comfort to anti-Semitism." In 1953, it was reported that Blackmore was distributing the anti-Semitic Protocols of the Elders of Zion from his parliamentary office.

Blackmore is a relative of the author Flora Jessop and her sister, Ruby Jessop.

References

External links
 

1890 births
1971 deaths
People from Cassia County, Idaho
Antisemitism in Canada
Anti-Masonry
Canadian anti-communists
Canadian Latter Day Saints
Members of the House of Commons of Canada from Alberta
New Democracy (Canada) candidates in the 1940 Canadian federal election
New Democracy (Canada) MPs
People excommunicated by the Church of Jesus Christ of Latter-day Saints
People from Cardston County
Mormon fundamentalists
Protocols of the Elders of Zion
Social Credit Party of Canada leaders
Social Credit Party of Canada MPs
American emigrants to Canada